Vaidy Somasundaram, also known as Vaidy S., is an Indian cinematographer, who primarily works in the Tamil, Kannada and Malayalam film industries.

Early life and career
After graduating with a gold medal in film technology and cinematography from the M.G.R. Government Film and Television Training Institute, Chennai, he debuted as a cinematographer in the Malayalam movie Kanne Madanguka. Then he worked with director A. K. Lohithadas in the movie Kasthuri Maan. Later he joined with the film director Boopathy Pandian in the movie Thiruvilaiyaadal Aarambam, a box office success. He also worked with Boopathy Pandian in the movies Malaikottai and Pattathu Yaanai.

He is known for his work in movies such as Googly and Rana Vikrama with Pavan Wadeeyar. For Googly, he won a SIIMA Award for Best Kannada Cinematographer.

Vaidy teamed up with Santhosh Ananddram’s  directorial debut Mr. and Mrs. Ramachari, which he won  SIIMA Award for Best Kannada Cinematographer for the second consecutive year.

His notable works with the director P. C. Shekar are Romeo and Raaga.

Filmography

Awards
3rd South Indian International Movie Awards
 Best Cinematographer Kannada for Googly

4th South Indian International Movie Awards
 Best Cinematographer Kannada for Mr. and Mrs. Ramachari

Sources

References

External links
 
 

Living people
Tamil film cinematographers
Malayalam film cinematographers
Kannada film cinematographers
Cinematographers from Tamil Nadu
M.G.R. Government Film and Television Training Institute alumni
Year of birth missing (living people)